Boris Mijatovič  (born 7 February 1988 in Yugoslavia) is a Slovenian footballer currently under contract with ND Gorica.

Career 
Mijatovič started his career at his hometown club NK Rudat Velenje at the age of 8. He rose through the ranks and made his league debut for the club in 2006 against NK Zagorje. Mijatovič made 39 league appearances and scored 1 goal for Rudar.

On 15 July 2009 he signed a 2-year contract with NK Celje.

Career statistics

References

1988 births
Living people
Slovenian footballers
Association football defenders
NK Celje players
NK Rudar Velenje players
ND Gorica players
Sportspeople from Slovenj Gradec